Fotimakhon Amilova (born 11 February 1999) is an Uzbeki Paralympic swimmer who represented Uzbekistan at the 2016 Summer Paralympics. She set a world record at the female SB13 100 m breaststroke. She had won gold, silver and bronze medals at Rio 2016 Paralympics.

References 

Uzbekistani female backstroke swimmers
Uzbekistani female breaststroke swimmers
Uzbekistani female butterfly swimmers
Uzbekistani female freestyle swimmers
Uzbekistani female medley swimmers
Paralympic bronze medalists for Uzbekistan
Paralympic gold medalists for Uzbekistan
Paralympic silver medalists for Uzbekistan
Swimmers at the 2016 Summer Paralympics
1999 births
Living people
Medalists at the 2016 Summer Paralympics
Paralympic swimmers of Uzbekistan
S13-classified Paralympic swimmers
Swimmers at the 2014 Asian Games
Asian Games competitors for Uzbekistan
Paralympic medalists in swimming
20th-century Uzbekistani women
21st-century Uzbekistani women
20th-century Uzbekistani people
21st-century Uzbekistani people
Medalists at the 2018 Asian Para Games